California City Correctional Facility (CAC) is a secure facility owned by CoreCivic. It is currently staffed and operated by the California Department of Corrections and Rehabilitation as a men's  level II (low-medium) security prison.

The facility was built on speculation, without any customer contract to fill it. Construction was completed in 1998. Beginning in 2006, it housed federal inmates for the U.S. Marshals Service and U.S. Immigration and Customs Enforcement. The federal contract included  daily transportation to the San Diego County Courthouse and Southern Nevada Correctional Center, and as-needed to JPATS-Victorville ("Con Air"). The per-diem rate in 2010 was $77.50 per prisoner, decreasing to $58.00 as the count increased. The federal use of the facility ended in 2013.

In response to a federal order to reduce overcrowding at the state's prison facilities, the California Department of Corrections and Rehabilitation started leasing the facility in 2013 for $28.5 million yearly. Former guards, previously privately contracted, transferred to become state correctional officers after eight weeks of training. CAC is the only CDCR state prison under this arrangement; all other state prisons are both owned and operated by CDCR. The state plans to terminate its lease so the prison will be effectively closed by March 2024.

References

Prisons in California
Buildings and structures in Kern County, California
CoreCivic
2006 establishments in California
California City, California